The 2007–08 Asia League Ice Hockey season was the fifth season of Asia League Ice Hockey. Seven teams participated in the league, and the Oji Eagles won the championship.

Regular season

Playoffs

External links
 Asia League Ice Hockey

Asia League Ice Hockey
Asia League Ice Hockey seasons
Asia